The North Hants Militia was a militia regiment in Hampshire, England which existed nominally from 1757 to 1853, as part of the reorganization of the standing armies of the United Kingdom brought in by the Militia Act of 1757.  The regiment was not continuously embodied, being mustered only in times of need.

In 1853, the North Hants Militia was merged with the South Hants Militia to form the Hampshire Regiment of Militia, which eventually became the 3rd Battalion of Royal Hampshire Regiment, now Princess of Wales's Royal Regiment.

Embodiments
(List incomplete)
 August 1757 – December 1762, as part of the Seven Years' War, stationings in Bristol, Bideford, Newbury, Berkshire.
 March 1778 – Deployments to American colonies, London (Gordon Riots)

Bibliography
 
 

Military units and formations in Hampshire
Infantry regiments of the British Army
Hampshire